The 2019 FC Taraz season was the club's first season back in the Kazakhstan Premier League following their relegation at the end of the 2017 season, and 28th season in total. Taraz finished the season in 10th position, qualifying for a two-legged Relegation play-off against FC Akzhayik. After a 0-0 draw in the first leg away in Oral, Taraz won the second leg 3-1 to retain their place in the Kazakhstan Premier League for the 2020 season. Taraz also participated in the Kazakhstan Cup, where they were defeated by FC Ordabasy in the Quarterfinals.

Squad

Transfers

In

Loans in

Released

Competitions

Premier League

Results summary

Results by round

Results

League table

Relegation play-off

Kazakhstan Cup

Squad statistics

Appearances and goals

|-
|colspan="14"|Players away from Taraz on loan:
|-
|colspan="14"|Players who left Taraz during the season:

|}

Goal scorers

Disciplinary record

References

External links

FC Taraz seasons
Taraz